This is a list of active and extinct volcanoes.

See also 
Volcanic Eifel

References 

Germany

Volcanoes
Volcanoes